is a passenger railway station located in the city of Ōtsu, Shiga Prefecture, Japan, operated by the private railway company Keihan Electric Railway. The station is located adjacent to the JR West Ishiyama Station with which it is connected by a concourse.

Lines

Station layout
The station consists of one island platform with an elevated station building.

Platforms

Adjacent stations

History
It was renamed to its present name on April 1, 1953. The station was relocated to its present location on March 1, 2005 and rebuilt as an elevated station building.

Passenger statistics
In fiscal 2018, the station was used by an average of 3481 passengers daily (boarding passengers only).

Surrounding area
 Renesas Semiconductor Manufacturing Shiga Factory (formerly Renesas Kansai Semiconductor)
Japan National Route 1

See also
List of railway stations in Japan

References

External links

Keihan official home page

Railway stations in Shiga Prefecture
Stations of Keihan Electric Railway
Railway stations in Japan opened in 1914
Railway stations in Ōtsu